The Gediminas' Cap was the most important regalia of the Lithuanian monarchs who ruled the Grand Duchy of Lithuania until the Union of Lublin in 1569. During the inaugurations of Lithuanian monarchs, the Gediminas' Cap was placed on the monarch's heads by the Bishop of Vilnius in Vilnius Cathedral. 

Its name comes from Grand Duke Gediminas, the founder of the Gediminids dynasty and patrilineal ancestor of Lithuanian rulers from the Kęstutaičiai and Jagiellonian dynasties.

The cap is mentioned in the 16th-century sources and was kept in the Lithuanian state treasury. It is depicted as a round unsegmented headdress in an armorial compiled for Povilas Alšėniškis. The Gediminas' Cap lost its significance following the Union of Lublin in 1569 which abolished a separate inauguration of the Lithuanian monarchs in Vilnius Cathedral.

Titles of Lithuanian monarchs
The Lithuanian monarchs initially were titled as kings when communicating with Western countries and as Grand Dukes when communicating with Ruthenia and tatars. In 1385, Lithuanian ruler Jogaila agreed in the Union of Krewo that the Lithuanian monarchs would be titled only as the Grand Dukes of Lithuania.

The title of the Grand Duke of Lithuania mostly came into force during the reign of Grand Duke Vytautas the Great, who concluded the Ostrów Agreement with his cousin Jogaila in 1392 and the agreement was confirmed in the Pact of Vilnius and Radom in 1401. Since then Jogaila was titled as the Supreme Duke of Lithuania. Vytautas the Great gained factual rule of Lithuania, which was recognized by the treaties. In 1398, the Lithuanian nobility declared Vytautas the Great as the King of Lithuania and, following the Congress of Lutsk in 1430, the crowning was sanctioned by Sigismund, Holy Roman Emperor. However, Vytautas died before the crown arrived.

Jogaila's brother Švitrigaila also sought to be crowned as King of Lithuania and Emperor Sigismund planned to arrive to Švitrigaila's crowning in Prussia, but the Lithuanian Civil War (1432–1438) broke out in which Švitrigaila and his supporters were defeated.

Jogaila's son Władysław III also titled himself as the Supreme Duke of Lithuania. John I Albert unilaterally declared himself as the Supreme Duke of Lithuania in 1492, but this title was rejected by the Lithuanian Council of Lords.

In 1544–1548 Sigismund I the Old expressed his supreme monarchical authority in Lithuania by again using the Supreme Duke of Lithuania title when his son Sigismund II Augustus was his vicegerent in Lithuania.

Inaugurations of Lithuanian monarchs 

The inaugurations of the Lithuanian monarchs were held in Vilnius Cathedral and consisted of placement of the Gediminas' Cap on the Lithuanian ruler's heads and presentation of a sword. The cap was placed on the head by the Bishops of Vilnius and the sword was presented by the Grand Marshals of Lithuania. The regalia of Vytautas the Great consisted of Gediminas' Cap, sword, ring, flag, and a seal.

On 29 June 1440, Casimir IV Jagiellon (at the time vicegerent of Supreme Duke Władysław III in Lithuania) was crowned by the Bishop of Vilnius as Grand Duke of Lithuania with Gediminas' Cap in the Vilnius Cathedral despite opposition by the Polish nobles, this way breaching the agreements of the Union of Grodno (1432) and terminating the Polish–Lithuanian union. It manifested Lithuania as a sovereign state and its ruler Casimir IV Jagiellon stressed himself as a "free lord" (pan – dominus).

Following the Union of Lublin, which formed the federative Polish–Lithuanian Commonwealth in 1569, and the death of the last Gediminid ruler Sigismund II Augustus in 1572, separate inaugurations in Vilnius Cathedral were abolished, therefore the Gediminas' Cap lost its ceremonial significance. The insignias of the Lithuanian rulers were not preserved and following the Union of Lublin only the seal (kept by the Grand Chancellor of Lithuania) and the flag (carried near the ruler by the Grand Flag Bearer of Lithuania) remained. 

The rulers of the Polish–Lithuanian Commonwealth were elected in joint Polish–Lithuanian election sejms until the Third Partition in 1795 and received separate titles of the King of Poland and Grand Duke of Lithuania. During the coronations of joint Polish–Lithuanian monarchs, the Polish crowns were also announced as a property of the Lithuanian nobles.

Gallery

See also
 Polish crown jewels, used by joint Polish–Lithuanian monarchs following the Union of Lublin in 1569.
 Cap of maintenance, a similar royal insignia of the British sovereign.
 Gediminas' Tower

References

History of Lithuania (1219–1569)
Lithuanian monarchy
Gediminas
Cultural history of Lithuania
Caps
Headgear in heraldry
State ritual and ceremonies